Dichoptic may refer to:
 Dichoptic arrangement, distribution of eyes that are laterally paired eyes and separately situated, in the morphology of animals such as vertebrates and most Arthropoda
 Dichoptic presentation is the presentation of independent, rather than coordinated, visual stimuli to an organism's two eyes